Jack Croft Richards (born 28 July 1943) is an applied linguist from New Zealand, specializing in second and foreign language education, teacher training, and materials design. He has written numerous articles and books. Most of his books and articles are in the field of second language teaching and have been translated into many different languages. He was appointed full professor in the Department of English as a Second Language at the University of Hawaii in 1981.

Education 
Born in New Zealand, Richards obtained a Master of Arts degree with first class honours in English from Victoria University in Wellington, New Zealand, in 1966. He obtained his Ph.D. in applied linguistics from Laval University in Quebec City, Canada in 1972.

Awards 
In 2011 he was awarded the honorary degree of Doctor of Literature by Victoria University, Wellington, in respect of his impacts to English language teaching and the arts.

In 2011, Richards was made an honorary professor in the Faculty of Education at the University of Sydney, Australia.

In 2014, Richards was made an honorary professor in the Faculty of Education at the University of Auckland, New Zealand.

Also in 2014, Richards received the prestigious Award for Patronage 2014, by the Arts Foundation of New Zealand, acknowledging his support for music and the arts.

Selected publications

Books 

 Richards, J. C. (2017). Curriculum Development in Language Teaching (2nd ed.). Cambridge University Press.
 Nunan, D., & Richards, J. C. (2014). Language Learning Beyond the Classroom (ESL & Applied Linguistics Professional Series) (1st ed.). Routledge.
 Richards, J. C. (2015). Key Issues in Language Teaching (1st ed.). Cambridge University Press.
 Richards, J. C., & Rodgers, T. S. (2014). Approaches and Methods in Language Teaching (Cambridge Language Teaching Library) (3rd ed.). Cambridge University Press.
 Richards, J. C., & Schmidt, R. W. (2010). Longman Dictionary of Language Teaching and Applied Linguistics (4th ed.). Routledge.
 Richards, J. C., & Renandya, W. A. (2002). Methodology in Language Teaching: An Anthology of Current Practice (1st ed.). Cambridge University Press.

Classroom Texts & Series 

 2019. Four Corners. (with David Bolhke) 2nd edition. Levels 1,2,3,4.
 2017. Interchange. (with J. Hull and S Proctor) 5th edition. Levels 1,2,3
 2012. Speak Now. (with David Bohlke). Levels 1,2,3.
 2011. Tactics for Listening. (3 level series). 3rd edition
2004. Connect. (with C.Sandy and C. Barbesan)

Articles 

 Sadeghi, K., Richards, J. C., & Ghaderi, F. (2019). Perceived versus Measured Teaching Effectiveness: Does Teacher Proficiency Matter? RELC Journal, 51(2), 280–293. https://doi.org/10.1177/0033688219845933
 Richards, J. C., & Wilson, O. (2019). On Transidentitying. RELC Journal, 50(1), 179–187. https://doi.org/10.1177/0033688218824780
 Richards, J. C. (2015a). The Changing Face of Language Learning: Learning Beyond the Classroom. RELC Journal, 46(1), 5–22. https://doi.org/10.1177/0033688214561621

References 

1943 births
Living people
21st-century New Zealand linguists
Victoria University of Wellington alumni
Université Laval alumni
21st-century New Zealand male writers
Linguists of English